Rob Persaud is a British music producer and songwriter who currently works and resides between Los Angeles, California and Nashville, Tennessee. He is published by Dr. Luke's Prescription Songs. He has produced, engineered, mixed or written tracks for Jay Sean, Lady Gaga, Chris Lane, Mollie King, Jordan Fisher, Before You Exit, Sabrina Carpenter, Josh Groban, Madison Beer, Nick Jonas, Breland, Billy Currington and others.

Selected discography

Film and television credits

References

Year of birth missing (living people)
Living people
British emigrants to the United States
British record producers
British songwriters